Aulacomya is a genus of edible saltwater mussels, marine bivalve molluscs in the family Mytilidae, the true mussels.

Species
Species within the genus Aulacomya include:
  Aulacomya atra (Molina, 1782)
  Aulacomya capensis (Dunker, 1846)
 Aulacomya maoriana (Iredale, 1915)
 Aulacomya regia Powell, 1957
Synonyms include:
 Aulacomya ater (Molina, 1782) accepted as Aulacomya atra (Molina, 1782)
 Aulacomya magellanica (Chemnitz, 1783) accepted as Aulacomya atra (Molina, 1782)

References

Mytilidae
Bivalve genera